Truesdell may refer to:

Given name
Truesdell Sparhawk Brown (1906–1992), classical scholar, ancient historian, co-founder of the journal California Studies in Classical Antiquity
Elmer Truesdell Merrill (1860–1936), American Latin scholar, born at Millville, Massachusetts
Jesse Truesdell Peck (1811–1883), American bishop of the Methodist Episcopal Church, elected in 1872

Surname
Aaron D. Truesdell, 19th-century American politician
Alex Truesdell (born c. 1955), American designer and maker
Clifford Truesdell (1919–2000), American mathematician, natural philosopher, and historian of science
Donald Leroy Truesdell (1906–1993), United States Marine Corps Corporal who received the Medal of Honor
Glenn Truesdell (1909–1992), American businessman and politician
Keith Truesdell, American television director and producer
Nathan Truesdell, independent film-maker
Nick Truesdell (born 1990), American football tight end
Xavier Lamar Truesdell (born 1985), also known as XL, American actor, model, singer, songwriter, and producer

Locations
Truesdell, Wisconsin, residential and business neighborhood of the city of Kenosha in east-central Kenosha County, Wisconsin, United States
90446 Truesdell, minor planet

Other
Truesdell middle school, a regular middle Wichita Public School, Kansas, United States
Truesdell Bridge Disaster, also known as the Dixon Bridge Disaster in 1873, when the bridge across the Rock River at Dixon, Illinois, collapsed
John and Edna Truesdell Fischer Farmstead, private farm, including house and outbuildings, at 4896–5228 Sheldon Road in Canton Township, Michigan
Ephraim and Emma Woodworth Truesdell House, private house at 1224 Haggerty Road in Canton Township, Michigan

See also
Raynor, Nicholas & Truesdell, New York brokerage based on Broadway in the 1920s
Trudel (disambiguation)
Trudell